George Byng, 7th Viscount Torrington (9 September 1812 – 27 April 1884), was a British colonial administrator and courtier.

Family
Torrington was the son of Vice-Admiral George Byng, 6th Viscount Torrington (1768-1831).

He succeeded his father in the viscountcy in 1831 at the age of eighteen. On 19 March 1833 he married Mary Anne, only daughter of Sir John Astley, 1st Baronet. Their only daughter, Frances Elizabeth, died on 2 September 1853. Lady Torrington died on 26 January 1885.

Career
In 1847 he was appointed Governor of Ceylon, a post he held until 1850. There he is known for his brutal suppression of the 1848 civil uprising, committing crimes against humanity, which led to his interdiction. He later served as a Permanent Lord-in-waiting to Albert, Prince Consort from 1853 to 1859 and to Queen Victoria from 1859 to 1884.

He served as Lieutenant-Colonel of the West Kent Light Infantry Militia  (later the 3rd and 4th Battalions, Queen's Own (Royal West Kent Regiment)) in the 1850s, was appointed as the regiment's Honorary Colonel in 1869.  

He was the companion of Andalusia Molesworth after she became a widow. When she died she left her fortune to Byng's nephew and heir as she was estranged from her ex-husband's family.

Death and burial
He died on 27 April 1884, aged 71 and was buried in the churchyard of St. Lawrence's Church, Mereworth, Kent.

Succession
He was succeeded in the viscountcy by his nephew George Byng, 8th Viscount Torrington.

References

 Kidd, Charles, Williamson, David (editors). Debrett's Peerage and Baronetage (1990 edition). New York: St Martin's Press, 1990.
 
 www.thepeerage.com

1812 births
1884 deaths
Viscounts in the Peerage of Great Britain
Governors of British Ceylon
Kent Militia officers
George